Payne's Creek is a  natural watercourse in Tehama County, California. The creek was apparently originally called Paines Creek according to an 1879 land survey map of the area. The town of Paynes Creek was named after the creek. The creek most likely was named after James S. Payne, the proprietor of a local sawmill.

The Payne's Creek watershed contains forested reaches, and also provides habitat for numerous understory flora and fauna. An example wildflower found in the watershed is the poppy Calochortus luteus, which is at its northern limit at the location of the Payne's Creek watershed.

See also
 Dye Creek

Line notes

References
 C. Michael Hogan. 2009. Gold Nuggets: Calochortus luteus, GlobalTwitcher.com, ed. N. Stromberg

See also
 List of rivers of California

Rivers of Tehama County, California
Rivers of Northern California